Sacchiphantes is a genus of true bugs belonging to the family Adelgidae.

Species:
 Sacchiphantes abietis
 Sacchiphantes  segregis
 Sacchiphantes viridis

References

Adelgidae